Audun Erlien (born 22 February 1967 in Oslo, Norway) is a Norwegian jazz musician (bass guitar, guitar and electronica), known from several albums in various genres.

Career 
Erlien was raised in Tønsberg, Norway, and has been a musician since 1985. He has participated on albums with the likes of
Knut Reiersrud (regular band member in the 1990es),
Bendik Hofseth (band member),
Jonas Fjeld,
Rick Danko and Eric Andersen,
David Lindley and Henry Kaiser,
Deeyah Khan,
Vidar Busk,
Anja Garbarek,
Silje Nergaard (bandmember 1985–91),
Alex Rosén,
Ciwan Haco,
Earl Wilson,
Grethe Svensen,
Øystein Sevåg,
Carsten Loly,
Ole Paus,
Karl Seglem,
Patrick Shaw Iversen,
Anita Skorgan,
Siri Christensen,
Jacob Young,
May Britt Haug,
Knut Halmrast,
Lakki Patey,
Kristin Skaare,
Jan Eggum,
Lars Lillo Stenberg,
Frode Alnæs (within his band),
Nils Petter Molvær (within Khmer, 1997–2002),
Dhafer Youssef,
Eivind Aarset (his own trio), Jarle Bernhoft,
Mahsa & Marjan Vahdat,
Mathias Eick (in his own Quintet).
Lisa Bonnár.
He also teaches bass guitar at the Norges Musikkhøgskole.

Discography

References

External links
Spiritsnutt at YouTube

20th-century Norwegian bass guitarists
21st-century Norwegian bass guitarists
Norwegian male bass guitarists
Norwegian jazz guitarists
1967 births
Musicians from Tønsberg
Living people
20th-century bass guitarists
21st-century Norwegian guitarists
20th-century Norwegian male musicians
21st-century Norwegian male musicians
Male jazz musicians
Norwegian musicians
Scandinavian musicians